Peter Quillin (born June 22, 1983) is an American professional boxer who held the WBO middleweight title from 2012 to 2014. He also challenged once for the WBA (Regular) middleweight title in 2015.

Early life
Peter Quillin was born in 1983 in Chicago, Illinois but was raised in Grand Rapids, Michigan. He is a Christian. During his amateur boxing career, he had 15 fights, and soon after the tall, aggressive fighter turned pro in New York. He said about his early life "Homelessness, a rotten childhood, no love in my household growing up, drugs, sexual assault, with all these things I experienced in life. No one can say my life isn’t a miracle."

Professional career

Quillin turned professional on June 9, 2005, after signing with promoter Cedric Kushner. In April 2008, Quillin dominated former contender Antwun Echols. On June 11, 2008, Peter defeated Dionisio Miranda by unanimous decision at the Hard Rock Cafe in New York City. Quillin won most of the early rounds of the fight and was cruising Miranda in the seventh round. Peter would recover well in the eighth round, after being caught by Dionisio. Then Quillin fought the last two rounds of the fight effectively, with the final judges’ scores being 97-92, 97-92, and 97-93.

In April 2010, Peter moved from New York City to Los Angeles to train with the 4-time trainer of the year Freddie Roach.

On April 29, 2011, Quillin stopped title contender Jesse Brinkley to win the vacant United States Boxing Organisation Super Middleweight Championship in Reno, Nevada.

On July 23, 2011, Quillin defeated late substitute Jason LeHoullier in Las Vegas. Although there were no knockdowns, LeHoullier was outclassed.

On November 5, 2011, Quillin made his HBO debut, stopping Craig McEwan in the 6th round in Cancún, Mexico. Then in June 2012 he fought Winky Wright, winning by unanimous decision and making Wright retire.

On September 4, 2014, Quillin vacated his WBO 160-pound title instead of facing the mandatory challenger Matvey Korobov for a purse that would have been over three times greater than any previous purse Quillin had received in his career.

On April 11, 2015, Quillin returned to the ring to fight Andy Lee at the Barclays Center in Brooklyn, New York in his Premier Boxing Champions debut, live on NBC. Due to not making weight at the weigh-in, however, Quillin was ineligible to win Lee's WBO World Middleweight Title. In the first round, Quillin dropped Lee hard with an overhand right near the end of round one and scored a questionable knockdown in round 3 when he stood on Lee's foot and tripped him. In round 7 however, Quillin tasted the canvas for the first time himself on a Lee right hook. For the rest of the fight Lee boxed consistently as Quillin's work rate and accuracy dropped. By the end of the 12th round, the fight was scored 113-112 for Lee, 113-112 for Quillin, and 113-113, making the official result of the fight a split draw.

Quillin vs. Jacobs 
On December 5, 2015, Quillin suffered the 1st defeat of his career suffering a TKO loss to Daniel Jacobs in the 1st round.

Quillin vs. Johnson 
On September 8, 2017, Quillin made his return to the ring winning a competitive fight with Dashon Johnson.

Quillin vs. Love 
In his next fight, Quillin fought J'Leon Love, who was ranked #6 by the IBF and #9 by the WBC at super middleweight. Quillin won the fight convincingly on the scorecards, 99-91, 98-92 and 98-92.

Quillin vs. Truax 
In his following fight, Quilling fought WBC #3 and IBF #5 at super middleweight, Caleb Truax. The fight ended in a no contest in the second round due to an accidental head clash.

Quillin vs. Angulo 
On September 21, 2019, Quillin fought Alfredo Angulo. Despite being the favorite, Quillin got outboxed by Angulo. Although Angulo was slow and did not really hurt Quillin much during the fight, Quillin also was not able to do much damage to Angulo. Two of the judges saw Angulo as the winner, scoring it 97-93 and 96-94 for him, while the third judge saw Quillin as the winner, scoring the fight 96-94 for Quillin.

Professional boxing record

References

External links

Peter Quillin profile at Premier Boxing Champions
Peter Quillin - Profile, News Archive & Current Rankings at Box.Live

1983 births
Living people
Boxers from Chicago
American male boxers
World Boxing Organization champions
World middleweight boxing champions
Super-middleweight boxers